Ramata Island is a small island about  long and less than  wide lying just off the New Georgia in the Solomon Islands.

The island is served by weekly flights to and from Ramata Airport.
The island is part of the chain that separates the north Marovo Lagoon, the longest island fringed lagoon in the world, from the Solomon Sea. A sports fishing lodge run by Solomon Islanders caters to tourists.

References

Islands of the Solomon Islands